Pryer is a surname. Notable people with the name Pryer include:

Barry Pryer (1925–2007), British cricketer
Charlene Pryer (1921–1999), American baseball player
William Burgess Pryer, (1843–1899) British businessman and founder of Sandakan, British North Borneo

See also
Pryor
Prier
Prior (disambiguation)